Prinos is a village on the island of Thasos in northern Greece. The village is located in the northwest of the island, 17.4 km southwest from the island's capital and main port of Limenas, and 21.8 km north of Limenaria (in the south of Thasos). The village of Skala Prinou (Σκάλα Πρίνου) is home to the second largest ferry port on the island, with regular routes to Kavala and Nea Peramos in mainland Greece.

References

External links
 Official municipality website

Populated places in Thasos